Mühlen in Taufers is a village in the municipality of Sand in Taufers in South Tyrol, Italy.

External links
Photo

Frazioni of South Tyrol
Former municipalities of South Tyrol